Lesbian, gay, bisexual and transgender (LGBT) rights have evolved significantly in the past decades in the British Overseas Territory of Gibraltar. Same-sex sexual activity has been legal since 1993 and the age of consent was equalised to 16 in 2012. The Supreme Court of Gibraltar ruled in April 2013 that same-sex couples have the right to adopt. Civil partnerships have been available to both same-sex and opposite-sex couples since March 2014, and in October 2016, Gibraltar voted to legalise same-sex marriage with the Civil Marriage Amendment Act 2016 passing unanimously in Parliament. The law received royal assent on 1 November and took effect on 15 December 2016.

Legality of same-sex sexual activity
In Gibraltar, the age of consent for all sexual activity regardless of sexuality and/or gender was equalised at 16 in April 2011, when under Supreme Court order the previous law – under which the age of consent for gay males was 18 – was found to be unconstitutional. Heterosexual anal sex was decriminalised at the same time and the age of consent set at 16. Gay male sexual conduct was decriminalised in 1993.

Political campaigning prior to the 2007 elections was prominent with equality rights organisation Gib Gay Rights (GGR), headed by human rights campaigner Felix Alvarez, openly challenging the incumbent Chief Minister, Peter Caruana, for more rights in Gibraltar for gay and lesbian people.

Campaigning on the issue of an equal age of consent of 16 had been strongly undertaken. The issues were raised at the Foreign Affairs Committee enquiry into the overseas territories in 2008, where they concluded:

We recommend that the Government should take steps to ensure that discrimination on the basis of sexual orientation or gender status is made illegal in all overseas territories.

On 18 May 2009, the Gibraltar Parliament rejected a private member's bill, proposed by the Minister for Justice, to equalise the age of consent. It was opposed by the GSLP/Liberal opposition for technical reasons due to the way the bill was written. Government MPs were given a free vote on the bill. It was defeated, as government MPs were split on its approval, and the opposition members all voted against it.

The influential Gibraltar Women's Association (GWA) also called for the age consent to be levelled at 18.

On 1 October 2009, new proposed legislation would enable the Government of Gibraltar to ask the Supreme Court to test whether existing or draft laws are compatible with the Constitution. This would provide a simplified, purpose-built mechanism to deal with contentious issues such as the age of consent. In March 2010, it sought an opinion from the Court to see if the unequal age of consent was discrimination under the principles of the European Council.

On 1 April 2010, Secretary of State for Foreign and Commonwealth Affairs David Miliband pointed out that if a British Overseas Territory is unwilling to meet "international obligations" such as equalising the age of consent it may be imposed by an Order in Council.

On 8 April 2011, the Supreme Court of Gibraltar ruled that a higher age of consent of 18 for gay sex was unconstitutional, and thus mandated an equal age of consent of 16, while at the same time also decriminalising heterosexual anal sex.

In August 2011, the gender-neutral Crimes Act 2011 was approved, which sets an equal age of consent of 16 regardless of sexual orientation, and reflects the recent Supreme Court decision in statute law. The law took effect on 23 November 2012.

Recognition of same-sex relationships

Civil partnerships
In March 2014, the Parliament passed a civil partnership law, granting same-sex couples most of the rights of marriage, including allowing the adoption of children by civil partners, as mandated by the court ruling in 2013.

Same-sex marriage
Same-sex marriage became an issue of interest for the government after its re-election in 2015. A command paper to that effect was published in December 2015 and a public consultation was held, whilst talk of a possible referendum on the issue was not ruled out. The leader of the opposition Social Democrats Party announced his support for same-sex marriage in January 2016, days before the government ruled out a referendum. An inter-ministerial committee was set up in March 2016 to listen to stakeholder concerns and more than 3,400 responses to the discussion were received. The government published a bill to legalise same-sex marriage in August 2016.

On 26 October 2016, the Civil Marriage Amendment Act 2016 was passed in the Gibraltar Parliament with unanimous support from all 15 members present during the vote. The bill received royal assent on 1 November and took effect on 15 December 2016. The first legally recognized same-sex marriage in Gibraltar took place the next day.

Adoption, surrogacy and family planning
On 10 April 2013, the Supreme Court ruled that section 5 (2) of the Adoption Act 1951 was in violation of the Gibraltar Constitution thus, in effect, de jure legalising LGBT adoption in Gibraltar. The government announced that they planned to amend the law as soon as possible and that the Care Agency would take appropriate measures to allow same-sex couples to adopt. The government did so the following year as part of its civil partnership law (see above).

In June 2017, the Gibraltar Health Authority approved an amendment to its in vitro fertilisation policy to allow lesbian couples to access assisted reproductive technology.

In February 2021, Gibraltar implemented a surrogacy law, allowing individuals and couples, married or in a civil partnership, unable to conceive, to engage in non-commercial, altruistic surrogacy. The legislation also provides automatic recognition to children of same-sex couples conceived through artificial insemination.

Discrimination protections
The 2006 Constitution does not mention sexual orientation. Proposals, made public in early March 2002, specifically omitted direct reference to "sexual orientation" as a category to be constitutionally protected. Other categories are clearly included.

The Equal Opportunities Act 2006, which came into force on 1 March 2007, prohibits discrimination in areas such as employment and the provision of goods and services on numerous grounds, including sexual orientation and "gender reassignment". "Sexual orientation" is defined as a "sexual orientation towards persons of the same sex, persons of the opposite sex, or persons of the same sex and of the opposite sex". "Gender reassignment" is defined as "a process for the purpose of reassigning a person's sex by changing physiological or other attributes of sex".

Hate crime legislation
A bill to amend the Crimes Act 2011, that would criminalise both hatred and harassment on the ground of sexual orientation as a hate crime, was approved by the Gibraltar Parliament on 19 September 2013 and given royal assent on 25 September. The law took effect on 10 October 2013.

In July 2021, the Gibraltar Justice Ministry is investigating a proposal for introducing new laws "tackling lurking homophobia". The move was revealed in Parliament by Chief Minister Fabian Picardo and comes against the backdrop of “disgusting lurking homophobia” on social media as a result of initiatives and events to mark Pride month earlier this year. “The Government will not accept the continued homophobia we are seeing,” Mr Picardo said. “The Government will therefore monitor whether it may be necessary to further bolster our legislation to make it a specific criminal offence to denigrate a person as a result of their sexual orientation.”

Summary table

See also

 Lesbianism in Gibraltar
 LGBT rights in Europe
 LGBT rights in the United Kingdom
 Same-sex marriage in Gibraltar
 Rodriguez v Minister of Housing

References

External links
 

 
Gibraltar law